White Arrow were Japanese limited express train services

White Arrow and White Arrows may also refer to:

 White Arrows, a Los Angeles rock band
 White Arrows (EP), by Australian band Full Scale
 White Arrow Trail, a trail on Mount Monadnock, New Hampshire
 Frecciabianca (Italian for WhiteArrow), the brand name for 200 km/h Italian high speed trains
 White Arrow, a UK parcel delivery company started by Great Universal Stores

See also
 Arrow (disambiguation)
 Black Arrow (disambiguation)
 Blue Arrow (disambiguation)
 Golden Arrow (disambiguation)
 Green Arrow (disambiguation)
 Pink Arrow (disambiguation)
 Red Arrow (disambiguation)
 Silver Arrow (disambiguation)
 Yellow Arrow (disambiguation)